The 2013 National Football League known for sponsorship reasons as the Allianz National Football League was the 82nd staging of the National Football League (NFL), an annual Gaelic football tournament for the Gaelic Athletic Association county teams of Ireland. The League began on Saturday 1 February 2014. Thirty-one Gaelic football county teams from the island of Ireland, plus London, participated. Kilkenny, who participated in previous years, withdrew from the competition.

The reigning League Champions were Cork. 2012 All-Ireland Champions Donegal competed in the top division, as did Mayo whom they beat in the 2012 All-Ireland Senior Football Championship Final. The losing All-Ireland finalists in 2010 and 2011, respectively Down and Kerry, were there too. The top division was completed by newly promoted Kildare and Tyrone and 2011 All-Ireland Champions Dublin. All-Ireland Champions Donegal travelled to Croke Park to play Kildare in their first league game of the season on 3 February 2013.

On 28 April, Dublin defeated Tyrone by 0-18 to 0-17 to win their first league title since 1993. Two late points by Dean Rock and one by Jack McCaffrey in the final four minutes steered Dublin to victory

Format

League structure
The 2013 format of the National Football League was a system of four divisions of eight teams. Each team played every other team in its division once, either home or away. 2 points were awarded for a win and 1 for a draw.

Tie-breaker
If only two teams were level on points:
 The team that won the head-to-head match was ranked first
 If this game was a draw, points difference (total scored minus total conceded in all games) was used to rank the teams
 If points difference was identical, total scored was used to rank the teams
 If still identical, a play-off was required
If three or more teams were level on points, points difference was used to rank the teams.

Finals, promotions and relegations
The top four teams in Division 1 contested the 2013 NFL semi-finals (first played fourth and second played third) and final. The top two teams in divisions 2, 3 and 4 were promoted, and contested the finals of their respective divisions. The bottom two teams in divisions 1, 2 and 3 were relegated.

Division 1

Table

Rounds 1 to 7

Division 1 Semi-finals

Division 1 final

Division 2

Table

Rounds 1 to 7

Division 2 final

Division 3

Table

Rounds 1 to 7

Division 3 final

Division 4

Table

Rounds 1 to 7

Division 4 final

Statistics
All scores correct as of 26 March 2016

Scoring
Widest winning margin: 15
Derry 2-17 - 1-5 Westmeath (Division 2)
Most goals in a match: 8
Monaghan 5-13 - 3-10 Wicklow (Division 3)
Most points in a match: 33
Armagh 0-21 - 1-12 Galway (Division 2)
Westmeath 0-17 - 0-16 Armagh (Division 2)
Most goals by one team in a match: 5
Monaghan 5-13 - 3-10 Wicklow (Division 3)
 Highest aggregate score: 47 points
Monaghan 5-13 - 3-10 Wicklow (Division 3)
Lowest aggregate score: 14 points
Waterford 0-6 - 0-8 Limerick (Division 4)

Top scorers
Overall

Single game

References

 

 

 
National Football League
National Football League (Ireland) seasons